François Bondy (1 January 1915 – 27 May 2003) was a Swiss journalist and novelist.

Biography
François Bondy was born on 1 January 1915 in Berlin. As a pupil at the lycée de Nice (1928–1933), he became one of the friends of Romain Gary, then Roman Kacew.

Career
He worked for Swiss and German newspapers and was reputed for his political commentaries. He translated all of Ionesco's books into German.

In 1940, Bondy worked for Die Weltwoche; in 1950, he joined the Congress for Cultural Freedom and established the monthly magazine Preuves in Paris. From 1970, he lived in Zürich. Bondy was the first Western intellectual who promoted among others the work of the Polish exile writer Witold Gombrowicz.

Death
He died on 27 May 2003 in Zürich.

Bibliography

Articles
"Letter from Paris: Two French Voices" Quadrant 1/1 (Summer 1956/57): 63–66.

20th-century male writers
20th-century Swiss journalists
20th-century Swiss novelists
1915 births
2003 deaths
Journalists from Berlin
Swiss magazine founders
Swiss male novelists